Live at Ronnie Scott's is a live album by British jazz singer Jamie Cullum. It consists of songs from the albums Catching Tales and Twentysomething. It is exclusive to iTunes.

Track listing
 "Photograph" (Jamie Cullum) – 6:52
 "Introduction to Nothing I Do" – 1:03
 "Nothing I Do" (Jamie Cullum) – 5:01
 "Introduction to 21st Century Kid" – 0:24
 "21st Century Kid" (Jamie Cullum) – 4:16
 "What a Difference a Day Makes" (María Grever) – 7:07
 "Introduction to Get Your Way" – 1:15
 "Get Your Way" (Allen Toussaint, Jamie Cullum, Dan Nakamura) – 4:00
 "Introduction to London Skies" – 1:07
 "London Skies" (Jamie Cullum) – 7:12
 "Introduction to Mind Trick" – 0:34
 "Mind Trick" (Jamie Cullum, Ben Cullum) – 4:45
 "Introduction to Back to the Ground" – 1:15
 "Back to the Ground" (Jamie Cullum, Ed Harcourt) – 5:37
 "All at Sea" (Jamie Cullum) – 6:34

Jamie Cullum albums
2006 live albums
ITunes-exclusive releases
Albums recorded at Ronnie Scott's Jazz Club